Gelanthi is a village in the municipality of Mouzaki, in the Karditsa regional unit, Greece. It is situated on the right bank of the river Pamisos, 3 km south of Gomfoi, 4 km east of Mouzaki and 20 km northwest of Karditsa.  Gelanthi had a population of 435 in 2011.

Population

History

The village Gelanthi was first mentioned in 1810, when the English traveller William Martin Leake passed through it on his way from Fanari to Mouzaki. He found the village had thirty houses.

References

External links
Official Website of Gelanthi
 Gelanthi on GTP Travel Pages

See also

List of settlements in the Karditsa regional unit

Populated places in Karditsa (regional unit)